"Edge of This World" (stylized as "EDGE OF THIS WORLD") is a song recorded by Japanese singer Misia for her tenth studio album, Soul Quest. It was released by Ariola Japan in truetone format on April 14, 2011 and as a digital single on April 28, 2011. It is the theme song to the anime film adaption of King of Thorn.

Composition
"Edge of This World" was composed in the key of E minor and set to a common time tempo of 123 beats per minute. Misia's vocals span from A3 to D5. The song was created right after the release of Just Ballade. Misia describes it as an "edgy ballad" with a "dark electro and house" sound. Misia has stated that the message expressed in her lyrics, that you can "shape the world to your desires", is a direct reflection of her feelings at the time and what led to creating the soulful R&B sound of Soul Quest. King of Thorn director Kazuyoshi Katayama has stated that he never considered anyone other than Misia to sing to theme song to his film.

Critical reception
CDJournal critics describe the song as a "love song with a serious mood" about "universal love". Misia was praised for the conscientious message of her lyrics.

Chart performance
"Edge of This World" debuted at number 43 on the Billboard Japan Hot Top Airplay chart and at number 48 on the Hot 100 chart. The song fell eighth spots down to number 56 on the Hot 100 in its second week and down to number 77 on its third week.

Credits and personnel
Personnel

 Vocals – Misia
 Songwriting – Misia, Sinkiroh
 Production, mixing – Gomi
 Strings arrangement – Gen Ittetsu
 Strings – Gen Ittetsu Strings
 Electronic keyboard – Satoshi Shimano, Henry Hey, Ethan White, Gomi
 Engineering – Ken Nishi, Noriyasu Murase
 Mastering – Gene Grimaldi

Charts

References

2010 singles
2010 songs
Misia songs
Songs written for animated films
Songs written by Misia
Song recordings produced by DJ Gomi